Shamloo may refer to:
 Ahmad Shamloo
 Shamlu (disambiguation), places in Iran